Delp is a surname. Notable people with the surname include:

Alfred Delp (1907–1945), German Jesuit priest and philosopher
Brad Delp (1951–2007), American singer and songwriter
Bud Delp (1932–2006), American racehorse trainer
Dan Delp (born 1964), American politician
Michael Delp, American writer